Agormanya is a small town in the Lower Manya Krobo district of the Eastern Region of Ghana.

References

Populated places in the Eastern Region (Ghana)